This is a list of Afrikaans-language films. For a more comprehensive list see :Category:Afrikaans-language films

1898 
Pres. Paul Kruger filmed in front of his house in Pretoria, on his way to the council.

1916 
 De Voortrekkers (first Afrikaans film)

1931 
 Moedertjie (first full-length film with Afrikaans dialogue)
 Sarie Marais, musical (first South African film with sound)

1938 
 Bou van ’n Nasie, documentary (second film with Afrikaans dialogue)

1942 
 Lig van 'n Eeu, documentary

1944 
 Donker Spore, drama

1946 
 Geboortegrond, drama
 Die wildsboudjie, comedy
 Die Skerpioen, drama
 Pikkie se Erfenis, drama

1947 
 Pantoffelregering, comedy
 Simon Beyers, drama

1948 
 Die kaskenades van Dr. Kwak, comedy

1949 
 Sarie Marais, drama
 Kom saam, vanaand, musical (first musical in Afrikaans)

1950 
 Hier's ons weer, comedy

1951 
 Alles sal regkom, comedy
 Daar Doer in die Bosveld, comedy (first South African film in colour)

1952 
 Altyd in my drome, musical
 Hans-die-Skipper, drama
 Vyftig-vyftig, comedy
 Die Leeu van Punda Maria

1953 
 Inspan, adventure, drama

1954 
 ’n Plan is ’n Boerdery, romantic comedy
 Daar Doer in die Stad, drama, comedy

1955 
 Vadertjie Langbeen, drama
 Matieland, romantic comedy
 Geld Soos Bossies, comedy (first South African film distributed overseas)

1956 
 Paul Krüger, biography, war drama

1957 
 Dis Lekker om te Lewe, comedy
 Donker Afrika, comedy

1958 
 Fratse in die vloot, comedy
 Die Bosvelder, comedy
 Die Goddelose Stad, drama

1959 
 Piet se tante, comedy
 Nooi van my Hart, comedy, romantic drama and musical
 Die Wildeboere, comedy

1959 
 Rip van Wyk, comedy/ fantasy
 Nooi van my hart, musical (first musical in Afrikaans filmed in colour)

1960 
 Oupa en die Plaasnooientjie, romantic comedy, drama
 Die Jagters, drama
 Die Vlugteling, drama
 Hou die Blinkkant Bo, comedy
 Kyk na die Sterre, drama

1961 
 Boerboel de Wet, comedy
 Doodkry is Min, political drama
 En die Vonke Spat, comedy
 Die Bubbles Schroeder Storie, crime
 Hans en die Rooinek, comedy
 Die Hele Dorp Weet, drama
 Moord in Kompartement 1001E, crime
 Basie, drama

1962 
 Lord Oom Piet, comedy
 Voor sononder, western
 Tom, Dirk en Herrie, comedy
 As Ons Twee Eers Getroud is!, comedy
 Die Tweede Slaapkamer, comedy
 Stropers van die Laeveld, action
 Jy's Lieflik Vanaand, musical
 Die Skelm van die Limpopo, drama
 Gevaarlike Spel, drama
 Man in die Donker, Neo-noir

1963 
 Huis op Horings, comedy
 Gee my jou hand, drama
 Die Reën Kom Weer, drama

1964 
 Piet my Niggie, comedy

1965 
 Debbie, drama
 Die Wonderwêreld van Kammie Kamfer, comedy
 Voortreflike Familie Smit, drama

1966 
 Kavaliers, action

1967 
 Kruger Miljoene, action, war, musical
 Hoor my Lied, musical
 Die Professor en die Prikkelpop, comedy

1968 
 Jy is my Liefling, musical
 Die Kandidaat, drama
 Majuba: Heuwel van Duiwe, war
 Oupa for Sale, comedy
 Dr Kalie, drama

1969 
 Katrina, romantic drama
 Stadig oor die Klippe, comedy
 Die Geheim van Nantes, romantic comedy
 Die Vervlakste Tweeling, comedy
 Majuba, war drama
 Vrolike Vrydag 13de, comedy
 Dirkie, adventure

1970 
 Jannie totsiens, mystery
 Vicki (Drama)
 Lied in My Hart, musical
 Onwettige Huwelik, comedy
 Hulda Versteegh MD, romantic drama
 Sien jou môre, drama
 Die drie Van der Merwes, comedy

1971 
 Pappalap, drama
 Die Erfgenaam, drama
 Die Banneling, action
 Breekpunt, drama
 Lindie, drama

1972 
 , musical
 , drama
 Pikkie, drama
 , thriller
 Die Marmerpoel, romantic drama
 , drama
 , drama
 , action
 , drama
 K9 Baaspatrolliehond, drama
 ,thriller

1973 
  (Drama) (Starring Marius Weyers, Sandra Prinsloo)
 , romantic drama
 , romantic drama
 , action
 , war, history
 Insident op Paradysstrand, drama
 , drama
 Afspraak in die Kalahari, drama
 , drama
 , drama
 , action
 , drama
 , comedy

1974 
 , comedy
 , romantic drama
 Babbelkous en Bruidegom, comedy
 ’n Sonneblom uit Parys, drama
 Geluksdal, drama
 
 Met Liefde van Adele, drama
 , comedy
 Skadu's van Gister, drama
 , adventure
 , comedy
 Suster Teresa, drama
 Kwikstertjie, drama

1975 
 , romantic drama
 , comedy drama
 , drama
 Somer, drama
 Troudag van Tant Ralie
 My Liedjie van Verlange, drama
 Vergeet My Nie, romantic drama, musical
 Jakkalsdraai se Mense, drama
 Trompie, comedy
 Liefste Veertjie, comedy
 Ma skryf matriek, comedy
 , drama
 , comedy
Dinetjie is dynamite

1976 
 Daar kom tant Alie, comedy
 Liefste Madelein, drama
 Vlindervanger
 'n Beeld vir Jeannie, drama
 Die Ridder van die Grootpad, drama
 Die Rebel, action
 'n Sondag in September, drama
 Haak Vrystaat, comedy
 Springbok Springbok, drama
 Die Hartseerwals, drama

1977 
 , comedy
 , horror
 , comedy
 Dingetjie en Idi, comedy
 Kom tot Rus, comedy
 Die Winter van 14 Julie, drama

1978 
 , comedy, drama
 , comedy
 Dit was Aand en dit was Môre
 'n Seder Val in Waterkloof, drama
 Dr Marius Hugo, romantic drama
 Sonja, drama
 , comedy

1979 
 , drama, comedy
 , drama
 , drama
 Weerskant die Nag, comedy
 , drama
 , war drama
 Die Eensame Vlug, drama

1980 
 The Gods Must Be Crazy (Comedy) (Starring Marius Weyers, Sandra Prinsloo)
 Kiepie en Kandas, romantic comedy
 , drama
 , musical

1981 
 , light romantic comedy
 , drama
 , drama

1982 
 , comedy

1983 
 , drama
 , comedy

1984 
 , drama
 Boetie Gaan Border Toe, comedy
 , comedy
 , drama
 , comedy

1985 
 , comedy
 , drama
 , comedy
 Nag van Vrees, thriller
 , drama, crime, horror

1986 
 Kampus: 'n Varsity Storie (Drama) (Starring Steve Hofmeyr)
 , comedy
 , romantic comedy

1988 
 Fiela se kind Fiela se kind, drama

1989 
 The Gods Must Be Crazy II
(Starring Hans Strydom, Pierre van Pletzen)

1990 
 , comedy
 Agter Elke Man (Drama)

1992 
 No Hero (Drama Romantic Comedy) (Starring Steve Hofmeyr)
 Die Storie van Klara Viljee (Drama) (Starring Annamart van der Merwe)
 Nag van die negentiende, drama
 Orkney Snork Nie (Die Moewie), comedy
 'n Pot Vol Winter, teen drama

1993 
 , comedy
 , comedy

1994 
 , comedy

1997 
 Paljas (Drama) (Starring Marius Weyers)
 , comedy

1998

2001 
 , family comedy

2003 
 Stander, (English film with some Afrikaans dialogue)

2007

2008 
 Bakgat!
 Triomf

2009

2010

2011 
 Bakgat 2
 Die Ongelooflike Avonture van Hanna Hoekom
 Egoli: Afrikaners is plesierig
 
 Ek lief jou
 Getroud met rugby
 
 Jakhalsdans
  (Musical Drama)
 
 'n Saak van Geloof 
 Skoonheid
 
 
 Susanna van Biljon

2012 
  (Drama) (Starring David Minnaar, Marius Weyers)
  (Musical) (Starring Steve Hofmeyr)
 Semi-Soet (Romantic Comedy) (Starring Nico Panagio, Lika Berning)
  (Drama)
  (Thriller Drama)
 Lien Se Lankstaanskoene (Drama)

2013 
 
 As Jy Sing (Musical)
 
 Bakgat 3
  (Drama)
  (Romantic Drama)
  (Comedy)
  (Romantic Comedy)
  (Drama)
 
 Musiek vir die Agtergrond
 Stuur groete aan Mannetjies Roux
 Verraaiers (Drama War)
 Dom Gedop

2014 
  (Romantic Comedy) (Starring Nico Panagio)
  (Romantic Comedy)
 Knysna (Romantic Comedy) (Starring Neels van Jaarsveld)
  (Drama Fantasy) (Starring Adam Tas)
 Leading Lady (Drama Comedy)
 Konfetti (Romantic Comedy)
 Alles Wat Mal Is (Comedy)
 Suurlemoen (Comedy)
 
 Ek Joke Net 2
 
 Teens Praat

2015 
 Treurgrond (Thriller Drama) (Starring Steve Hofmeyr)
 Uitvluct (Drama) (Starring Stian Bam)
 French Toast (Romantic Comedy)
 Verskietende Ster (Drama)
 Abraham Abraham 
  (Drama)
 Die Ontwaking 
 Die Pro (Drama)
 Dis ek, Anna 
 
 ’n Man soos my pa
  (Romantic Comedy)
 Seun 
 Sink 
 Somer Son
 Strikdas
 Trouvoete
 Stilte aan 'n Moordenaar
 Teens Praat 2

2016 
 Vir Die Voëls (Romantic Comedy)
 Sonskyn Beperk (Romantic Comedy)
 THE RECCE
 Beeldskoon 
 Dis koue kos,  skat
 Eintlik Nogal Baie 
 Free State  
 Johnny is nie dood nie
 Jonathan: Die Movie 
 Jou Romeo
 Lollos 8 Skaterlag! 
 Mignon "Mossie" van Wyk
  
 Call Me Thief
 O Vet! 
 'n Pawpaw vir my darling 
 Snaaks genoeg
   
 Tess
 Tussen as en hoop 
 Twee grade van moord
  
 Die Groentjie Step-Up

2017 
 Jagveld
 Johnny Is Nie Dood Nie
 Krotoa
 Liewe Kersfeesvader
 Die Rebellie van Lafras Verwey
 Tess
 Hoender met die rooi skoene
 
 Kampterein
 Vaselinetjie :af:Vaselinetjie
 Vuil Wasgoed

2018 
 Susters (Drama Comedy)
 Kanarie
 Raaiselkind
 Meerkat Maantuig
 Wonderlus
 Nommer 37
 Thys & Trix
 Salute! (film)
 Stroomop
 Ellen's: Die storie van Ellen Pakkies
 The Recce

2019 
 Ander Mens
 Fiela se Kind (2019)
 Liewe Lisa
 Moffie
 Die Seemeeu (The Seagull)
 Die Stropers (The Harvesters)
 Die verhaal van Racheltjie de Beer (The Story of Racheltjie De Beer)

2020 
 Toorbos
 Vergeet My Nie

2021 
 Kaalgat Karel
 Klein Karoo 2

References 

Spore in die sand

Voetspore in die sand

Gert vd Bergh het daarin n rol vertolk  - Swart en wit film gewees

External links 
 Rolprente met Afrikaanse dialoog op IMdb.com
 Flieks in Afrikaans op afrikaansefilms.com

 
Afrikaans
South Africa-related lists